Billie Bristow (5 January 1897 – 14 March 1981) was a British screenwriter active during the 1930s. She got her start as a journalist and studio publicist. She often wrote her scripts with Charles Bennett (who wrote many of Alfred Hitchcock's earliest films). She began her career at George King Productions and later worked at British Lion.

Selected filmography 

 Night Mail (1935)
 Gay Love (1934)
 Warn London (1934)
 The Secret of the Loch (1934)
 Tiger Bay (1934)
 The House of Trent (1933)
 Men of Steel (1932)
 Self Made Lady (1932)
 Deadlock (1931)

References 

British women screenwriters
1897 births
1981 deaths
20th-century British screenwriters